Jack Evans (born March 3, 1953, Anamosa, Iowa) is an American musician and songwriter.

Evans, a 1978 graduate of Boston's Berklee College of Music with a Bachelor of Music Composition Degree, went on to form the award-winning band Reverend Zen. The New York band's first album was Angels, Blues, and the Crying Moon on Blakjak Music Records, Anamosa Songs ASCAP c2006. The group's ten song video collection entitled Reverend Zen The Videos was released in 2015 in association with Blakjak Music Records, Anamosa Songs ASCAP c2015. In 2019 the band released their single "Magdalena - New Wings" on Blakjak Music Records, Anamosa Songs ASCAP c2019. He's won seventy five songwriting and performance awards with Reverend Zen around the world including:
2017 Winner Jango Radio / Radio Airplay Summer Song Contest - NYC
2016 Semi-finalist Australia Song Contest - Sydney
2016 Runner Up Song of the Year Contest - Houston
2015 Finalist Great American Song Contest - Portland
2015 Semi-finalist UK Song Contest - London, UK
2011/12 ASCAP Plus Award – N.Y.C.
2010/11 ASCAP Plus Award – N.Y.C.
2010 Semi-finalist UK Song Contest – London, UK
2009/10 Artist of the Year Nomination & 2009/10 Song of the Year Nomination with 9 Finalist Awards ABC Radio Networks Fame Games Effigy Awards, Costa del Sol Spain / N.Y.C.
2009/10 ASCAP Plus Award – N.Y.C.
2009 Semi-finalist UK Song Contest – London, UK
2009 Semi-finalist Australia Song Contest – Sydney, Australia
2008/09 Artist of the Year Nomination and 7 Finalist Awards ABC Radio Networks Fame Games Effigy Awards – Costa del Sol, Spain / N.Y.C.
2008/09 ASCAP Plus Award – N.Y.C., 2 Finalist Awards 
2008/09 Unisong International Song Contest – Los Angeles
2008 Best Song Nomination Los Angeles Music Awards – Los Angeles
2008 Best Song Nomination Toronto Exclusive Magazine Awards – Toronto, Canada
2008 Finalist with 3 Semi-finalist Awards France's 100% Song Contest – Arville / Paris, France 
2008 3 Semi-finalist Awards UK Song Contest – London, UK
2008 Semi-finalist Award Australia Song Contest  – Sydney, Australia
2008 Golden Wave Artist of the Year Award – The Colorado Wave – Indie Music Wave shows I Radio LA – Denver/Los Angeles
2007/08 Song of the Year & 2007/08 Artist of the Year Nominee with 5 Finalist Awards ABC Radio Networks Fame Games Effigy Awards – Costa del Sol, Spain / N.Y.C.
2007/08 ASCAP Plus Award – N.Y.C.
2007 Artist of the Year with 4 Best Song Nominations Los Angeles Music Awards
2007 Artist of the Year WCH Radio – St. Louis, 2 Finalist Awards
2007/08 Unisong International Song Contest – L.A.
2006 Bronze Artist Award RGW Radio – Norfolk, UK
2006 Finalist VH1 Song of the Year Contest with 5 Runner-up Awards – Houston/N.Y.C.
He has also won multiple awards from the Billboard World Song Contest – N.Y.C., the Mid Atlantic Song Contest – Washington, DC and the Singer/Songwriter Awards in London, U.K.

Involvement in Reverend Zen

Evans is the lead singer and drummer of Reverend Zen, and put together the band with over 10 other musicians. Some of those musicians have performed with Bruce Springsteen, Sting, Stevie Wonder, Eric Clapton, Annie Lennox, Elvis Costello, Shawn Colvin, Donald Fagen, John Scofield, B.B. King, David Sanborn, Sheryl Crow, Aretha Franklin, John Mayer, Joni Mitchell, Albert Collins, Michael Jackson. Evans and Reverend Zen also appear on the compilation releases "Fresh Produce 4" c2007 from MVY Radio – Martha's Vineyard, Nantucket, Cape Cod, Ma.,Newport, R.I., "Music For Coffee Beings" c2007 from RPW Records – Vancouver, Canada, "Songwriters & Storytellers" c2007 from Indie Artist Alliance – San Francisco, Ca., "Just Talents" c2007 from Research Music – Miami, Fla., Rio de Janeiro, Brazil, Berlin, Germany.

References

External links
 Jack Evans
 Reverend Zen

American rock musicians
Songwriters from Iowa
American male singers
Living people
1953 births
People from Anamosa, Iowa
Singers from Iowa
American male songwriters